The Paddock Arcade is a 19th-century shopping mall located in Watertown, New York. Built in 1850, it is the second oldest covered shopping mall and the oldest continuously running enclosed shopping mall in the United States. Since it has seen uninterrupted use since it opened in 1850, it carries the distinction of being the country's oldest, continuously operating covered shopping mall. The Paddock Arcade was listed on the National Register of Historic Places in 1976.

Location and architecture 

At No. 1 Public Square, the arcade remains the benchmark structure in Watertown's historic downtown district. The structure runs perpendicular to the adjoining Paddock Building. The arcade was built in the Gothic style, topped with a glass roof that allowed daylight to filter through. The Paddock Building contains a 19th-century Italianate facade.

History 

The arcade was built by Watertown native Loveland Paddock and designed by architect Otis Wheelock.  It was based on similar arcades built during that era in the United States and Europe.  Shops occupied the bottom floor, while the upper floors were used for office space.

In about 1916, a large section of the Paddock Building was demolished to make way for the six-story Woolworth Building. In the 1920s, arcade owners put forth a major redesign of the arcade, eschewing its original Gothic interior with a more modern design, which included the installation of the current translucent, steel-and-wire-glass dropped ceiling between its second and third stories. This ceiling still allowed light to filter in from the arcade's glass roof.

Today 

The arcade still functions as a shopping and business center in Watertown's downtown district. In recent years, structural and aesthetic improvements, coupled with new businesses are helping to guarantee the arcade's future. The arcade is the current (2013) home to Europe Cakes, Johnny D's Casual Dining, Paddock Club Tavern, Steve Weed Productions, The Village Peddler bicycle shop, Paddock Antiques, Satyana Yoga, Beauty Bar, Vito Gourmet, Bova Photography. In 2007, it was announced that the arcade would be host to Watertown's popular farmers' market for its extended fall season.

See also 
 Public Square (Watertown, New York)
 Italianate architecture
 Gothic Revival architecture
 Galleria Vittorio Emanuele II
 Cleveland arcade
 Westminster Arcade, the oldest enclosed shopping mall in the United States

References

External links

  City of Watertown 
 Otis Wheelock
 Watertown Downtown Business Association
 Official Website National Register of Historic Places
 Farmers Market Moves To Arcade

Shopping malls established in 1850
Shopping malls in New York (state)
Commercial buildings on the National Register of Historic Places in New York (state)
Tourist attractions in Jefferson County, New York
Shopping arcades in the United States
National Register of Historic Places in Jefferson County, New York
National Register of Historic Places in Watertown, New York